Vasily Alekseyevich Lyovshin (July 17, 1746 – August 10, 1826) was a Russian writer.

Born in Smolensk, he wrote on agricultural and economic subjects and was close to Nikolay Novikov's circle.

Lyovshin's utopian novel Noveysheye Рuteshestviye (The Newest Voyage, 1784) contains the first Russian flight to the Moon.

External links 

 
 

Russian writers
1746 births
People from Smolensk
1826 deaths
Russian food writers